Scopula pedilata is a moth of the family Geometridae. It is found in Sri Lanka.

Description
Its wingspan is about 22 mm. It is a white moth with fuscous palpi. Forewings irrorated (sprinkled) with a few black scales and with two minute cell-specks. There are traces of a medial line angled below the costa. The postmedial line running out to two angles below costa and one on vein 3. A rufous-brown band found beyond it with waved outer edge and terminating in a black patch. Traces of a pale submarginal rufous line. Hindwings with slightly waved antemedial line. Black cell-speck present. Postmedial slightly sinuous line, with pale rufous band beyond it. A crenulate (scalloped) marginal line.

References

Moths described in 1875
pedilata
Moths of Sri Lanka